Don Julian is the name of:

 Don Julian (musician) (1937–1998), American funk and soul guitarist and composer
 Julian, Count of Ceuta (7th-century–8th-century), North African ruler who had a role in the Umayyad conquest of Hispania
 William "Don Julian" Workman, (1799-1876), California rancher and landowner